Stari Grad or Stara Varoš, was one of five city municipalities which constituted the City of Kragujevac. It was the central city municipality and the most populous. The municipality was formed in May 2002, only to be dissolved in March 2008.

Subdivisions

The Municipality of Stari Grad comprised 10 neighbourhoods:

 Aerodrom
 Bagremar
 21. Oktobar
 Stara Radnička Kolonija
 1 May
 Bubanj
 Sušica
 Vašarište
 City Center
 Palilula
 Erdoglija

References

Šumadija
Defunct urban municipalities of Kragujevac
Spatial Cultural-Historical Units of Great Importance